Hairé is a rural commune in the Cercle of Douentza of the Mopti Region of Mali. The commune contains around 32 villages and in the 2009 census had a population of 29,741. The main village (chef-lieu) is Boni.

References

Communes of Mopti Region